Love (stylized as the red heart emoji ❤️) is the tenth studio album by Canadian singer, Michael Bublé. It was released on November 16, 2018, by Reprise Records. It is supported by the lead single "When I Fall in Love".

Background and writing
Love is Bublé's first release of any kind in two years, following his eldest son Noah being diagnosed with liver cancer, which he has said made him consider "never returning to music". He later returned to write and record songs in the studio as his son's condition improved. On his approach to the album, Bublé stated: "My end game for the new record was to create a series of short cinematic stories for each song I chose and have it stand on its own." Once the rough outline of his album concept was formed he pitched the idea to his band members while they were visiting his Vancouver home for a casual jam session and video games.

For the album, Bublé wrote the original song "Forever Now" and co-wrote the track "Love You Anymore" with Charlie Puth. The singer coaxed his mentor David Foster out of retirement from studio projects to oversee development of much of the album. Bublé originally thought he would title the album My Romance in reference to his rekindled romance with music, but he decided against it because he felt the title would involve frequent contextual explanation.

Promotion
Bublé announced the album in a Facebook Live stream, where he acknowledged the time he had spent away from music. The album was also called his "most romantic record to date". He performed a section of "Love You Anymore" on Carpool Karaoke for Stand Up to Cancer on October 26, 2018. He performed on The Graham Norton Show on November 9 and The X Factor on November 11.

Singles
The first single from the album, "When I Fall in Love", was released on September 27, 2018. It was followed by the original song, "Love You Anymore", on October 12, and finally "Such a Night" on November 9, one week before the album's release.

Commercial performance
In Canada, Love debuted at number 2 on the Canadian Albums Chart with 26,000 album-equivalent units. It is Bublé's seventh top-two debut in the country. In his second week, Love reached number one on the chart, with 21,000 equivalent units. On January 2, 2019, Love was certified Platinum by Music Canada for shipments of 80,000 copies in the country.

In the United States, Love debuted at number 2 on the Billboard 200 with 111,000 units, 105,000 of which were pure album sales. It became Bublé's eighth top-10 album and sixth top-2 on the Billboard 200.

In the United Kingdom, Love debuted at number one with sales of 66,794 (88% of the sales being physical CDs), making it Bublé's fourth chart-topping record on the UK Albums Chart.

Track listing

Charts

Weekly charts

Year-end charts

Certifications

References

2018 albums
Albums recorded at Capitol Studios
Albums recorded at The Warehouse Studio
Juno Award for Adult Contemporary Album of the Year albums
Michael Bublé albums
Reprise Records albums